Levi was, according to the Book of Genesis, the third of the six sons of Jacob and Leah (Jacob's third son), and the founder of the Israelite Tribe of Levi (the Levites, including the Kohanim) and the great-grandfather of Aaron, Moses and Miriam. Certain religious and political functions were reserved for the Levites.

Origins
The Torah suggests that the name Levi refers to Leah's hope for Jacob to  join with her, implying a derivation from  Hebrew yillaweh, meaning he will join, but scholars suspect that it may simply mean priest, either as a loan word from the Minaean lawi'u, meaning priest, or by referring to those people who were joined to the Ark of the Covenant. Another possibility is that the Levites were a tribe of Judah not from the clan of Moses or Aaron and that the name "Levites" indicates their joining - either with  the Israelites in general or with the earlier Israelite priesthood in particular.
The Book of Jubilees states that Levi was born "in the new moon of the first month", which means that he was born on 1 Nisan.

Levi and the "Blessing of Jacob"
In the Book of Genesis, Levi and his brother, Simeon, exterminate the city of Shechem in revenge for the rape of Dinah, seizing the wealth of the city and killing the men. The brothers had earlier misled the inhabitants by consenting to Dinah's rapist marrying her in exchange for the men of the city to be circumcised, and when Jacob hears about their destruction of Shechem, he castigates them for it. In the Blessing of Jacob, Jacob is described as imposing a curse on the Levites, by which they would be scattered, in punishment for Levi's actions in Shechem. Some textual scholars date the Blessing of Jacob to a period between just one and two centuries prior to the Babylonian captivity, and some Biblical scholars regard this curse, and Dinah herself as an aetiological postdiction to explain the fates of the tribe of Simeon and the Levites, with one possible explanation of the Levites' scattered nature being that the priesthood was originally open to any tribe, but gradually became seen as a distinct tribe itself. Nevertheless, Isaac, Levi's grandfather, gives a special blessing about the lineage of priests of God.

The family of Levi
In the Book of Genesis, Levi is described as having fathered three sons—Gershon, Kohath, and Merari. A similar genealogy is given in the Book of Exodus, where it is added that among Kohath's sons was one—Amram—who married a woman named Jochebed, who was closely related to his father, and they were the biological parents of Moses, Aaron, and Miriam; though some Greek and Latin manuscripts of the Torah state that Jochebed was Amram's father's cousin, the Masoretic Text states that she was his father's sister, and the Septuagint mentions that she was one of his father's sisters. The Masoretic Text's version of Levi's genealogy thus implies (and in Numbers 26:59, explicitly states) that Levi also had a daughter (Jochebed), and the Septuagint implies further daughters. The names of Levi's sons, and possible daughter, are interpreted in classical rabbinical literature as being reflections on their future destiny. In some apocryphal texts such as the Testaments of the Twelve Patriarchs, and the Book of Jubilees, Levi's wife, his children's mother, is named as Milkah, a daughter of Aram.

Family tree

In post-Torah tradition

In accordance with his role as founder of the Levites, Levi is referred to as being particularly pious. The Blessing of Moses, which some textual scholars attribute to a period just before the deuteronomist, speaks about Levi via an allegorical comparison to Moses himself, which haggadah take to support the characterization of Levi (and his progeny) as being by far the greatest of his brothers in respect to piety. The apocryphal Prayer of Asenath, which textual scholars believe dates from some time after the first century AD (scholarship in regards to the dating is currently quite contentious, with dates ranging from near the first century, to the fourth or fifth centuries), describes Levi as a prophet and saint, able to forecast the future, understand heavenly writings (astrology? weather trends?), and someone who admonishes the people to be forgiving, as well as in awe of God. The Book of Malachi argues that the Levites were chosen by Yahweh to be the priests because of Levi as minister of God, was specified only the true religious regulations, was reverent, revered Yahweh, was in awe of the God's name, upheld peace, was a model of good morality, and turned many people from sin.

Testament of Levi

The Testament of Levi is believed to have been written between 153 BC and 107 BC, and closer to the latter date. 
On his deathbed, Levi gathered all his children to narrate the story of his life to them, and prophesied unto them what they would do, and what would happen to them until judgment day. He also told them that God had chosen him and his seed as priest of Lord unto eternity. In this testament, Levi is described as having had two visions. The first vision covered eschatological issues, portraying the seven heavens, the Jewish Messiah, and Judgement Day. The second vision portrays seven angels bringing Levi seven insignia signifying priesthood, prophecy, and judgement; in the vision, after the angels anoint Levi, and initiate him as a priest, they tell him of the future of his descendants, mentioning Moses, the Aaronid priesthood, and a time when there would be priest-kings; this latter point was of particular interest to the Maccabean period of John Hyrcanus, who was both a high priest, and warrior-king.

The Book of Jubilees similarly has Isaac telling Levi of the future of his descendants, again predicting priesthood, prophets, and political power, and additionally describes Jacob as entrusting Levi with the secrets of the ancients, so that they would be known only to the Levites; however, like the Testament of Levi, the Book of Jubilees is regarded as a Maccabean-era document.

Tomb 
A Samaritan tradition recorded in the late 19th century considered Neby Lawin, just north of Silat ad-Dhahr to be the burial place of Levi.

See also
 Levite
 Miscegenation
 Tribe of Levi
 Lévai (surname originating from the Tribe of Levi)

References

External links

“The Tribe: The Cohen-Levi Family Heritage” (cohen-levi.org)

Founders of biblical tribes
Children of Jacob
Book of Genesis people
Tribe of Levi
Book of Jubilees